Shaila Catherine is an American Buddhist meditation teacher and author in the Theravādan tradition, known for her expertise in insight meditation (vipassanā) and jhāna practices. She has authored three books on jhāna practice and has introduced many American practitioners to this concentration practice through her writings and focused retreats.

Catherine is the founder of Insight Meditation South Bay in Mountain View, California, and the primary teacher for Bodhi Courses, an online Buddhist classroom. She conducts retreats locally, nationally and internationally in mindfulness (satī), concentration (samādhi and jhāna), lovingkindness (mettā), and insight meditation (vipassanā).

Biography

Shaila Catherine began meditating in 1980 in California. She later travelled and studied in Asia, training and practicing with an Advaita Vedanta master, H.W.L. Poonja, in northern India; Tibetan Dzogchen masters Tulku Urgyen Rinpoche and Nyoshul Khen Rinpoche in Nepal; and at Theravādan forest monasteries in Thailand.

In addition to these Asian masters, she has studied with founders of Western meditation centers (Christopher Titmuss, Joseph Goldstein, Sharon Salzberg, and Lama Surya Das).

Catherine developed a special interest in the practice of deep concentration, and in 2003–2004 devoted a one-year silent meditation retreat to exploring jhāna as the basis for insight. Based upon her experiences in this retreat, she wrote Focused and Fearless, as an introduction to the absorption states of jhāna.

In 2006, she began training under the guidance of the Burmese meditation master Venerable Pa Auk Sayadaw. In 2011 Catherine authored a second book, Wisdom Wide and Deep, which provides an introduction to the comprehensive practices of samādhi and vipassanā based on her training with Pa Auk Sayadaw and derived from teachings in the early Discourses of the Buddha, Visuddhimagga, and Abhidhamma.

Catherine's writings and teaching have contributed to a new and growing field within Theravādan Buddhism—introducing the traditional trainings of jhāna and insight meditation (vipassanā) to Western lay practitioners.

Bibliography 

 Catherine, Shaila.  Focused and Fearless: A Meditator’s Guide to States of Deep Joy, Calm and Clarity, Boston: Wisdom Publications, 2008. 
 Catherine, Shaila. Wisdom Wide and Deep: A Practical Handbook for Mastering Jhanā and Vipassanā, Boston: Wisdom Publications, 2011. 
 Catherine, Shaila. Beyond Distraction: Five Practical Ways to Focus the Mind, Boston: Wisdom Publications, 2022.

Audio Publications 
  DharmaSeed
 Audiodharma

Interviews 
 When Students Get Distracted
 How To Focus
 Jhana and the Practice of True Happiness
 Settle into the Bliss
 Focused and Fearless with the Jhanas
 The Way of Commitment
 Concentrating the Hell Out of Mind: Jhana Interviews with four experts

References

External links 
 Shaila Catherine 
 Insight Meditation South Bay
 Official biography
 Bodhi Courses

American Buddhists
American scholars of Buddhism